Women in Cambodia, due to the influence of the dominant Khmer culture, are traditionally expected to be modest and soft-spoken. They are to be well-mannered,  industrious,  and hold a sense of belonging to the household.  It is expected that they act as the family's caregivers and caretakers,  financial administrators,  and serve as the "preserver of the home".  As financial administrators, women can be identified as having household authority at the familial level.  Khmer women are expected to maintain virginity until marriage, become faithful wives,  and act as advisors to their husbands.  Women in Cambodia have also be known as “light” walkers--  "light" walking and refinement of the Khmer women is further described as being "quiet in […] movements that one cannot hear the sound of their silk skirt rustling". 

In recent years, women have become more active in the traditionally male-dominated spheres of work and politics in Cambodia.

Work

In the wake of the Cambodian Civil War, Cambodia suffered a deficit in male laborers. As a result, the women took on the responsibilities previously done by men.   Under Cambodian law, women are entitled to "equal pay for equal work".  However, in reality, most women receive lower wages than their male counterparts.   During the 1990s, many "uneducated young women" from rural areas ventured into the city to work in garment factories.

In 2004, the organization, Gender and Development for Cambodia, stated that 6% of the female workforce in Cambodia is paid.

Religion 

Khmer women are often active in worshipping at Buddhist temples and participating in religious ceremonies-- particularly during the thngai sil (English for "holy days").  Some women not only participate as worshippers, but become Buddhist nuns-- particularly the widowed and the elderly.

Education

13.8% of Cambodian women were reported as being illiterate in 2019. In 2004, it was reported that only 16% of the girls in Cambodia were enrolled in lower secondary schools.  Girls in Cambodia lack access to education due to gender role expectations and other socio-economic realities.  Girls in Cambodia are needed at home to take care of younger siblings, perform household duties, and support the head of the home.  Other factors include extreme poverty, the distance between home and school, as well as an ever-present fear for personal safety while traveling alone. 

However, despite these low statistics, there is a growing number of women present in Cambodia's universities. As of 2004, 20% of university graduates were women.

Funded by Google.org, the philanthropic arm of Google, SHE Investments and Youth Business International (YBI) created an initiative to help underserved female business owners recover from the Covid-19 pandemic.   Through this program, women learn about digital literacy, crisis management, financial management, and business model adaption.  As of September 2021, 94 out of 97 women graduated and said they would recommend the program to others.  In addition, 78 businesses remained operational at the end of the program. Monthly revenue of the participants increased by 169 percent.  A total of 584 jobs were either retained, re-hired, or newly created.

Political status
From the 1980s to present day, the number of female participants in Cambodian politics has remained low.  They are under-represented in high-level positions at both the local and national levels of the government.   Since 1993 there has been a modest rise in the participation of Cambodian women including leadership in non-governmental organizations focusing on the issues and rights of women.

It was reported in 2004 that 10% of National Assembly members, 8% of Commune Council members, and 7% of Cambodian judges were women.

Legal status
Throughout the nation’s history and within national legislation, men and women in Cambodia have always had equal rights.   This equality is also stated in the Constitution of Cambodia.  Cambodian women benefit from inheritance laws. These laws mean that they can own property, "bring property into a marriage", and claim the property as their own if they choose to do so.  Women in Cambodia can also easily obtain a divorce.  In 2005, Cambodia outlawed marital rape.

Prostitution

Prostitution in Cambodia encompasses local women,   women from Vietnam,  and is being linked to the sex trade in nearby Thailand.  As a result of this wide-spread prostitution, approximately 2.8% of Cambodia's population are infected with HIV/AIDS.

Sex trafficking

Women and girls in Cambodia are trafficked both domestically and throughout the world. In many cases, they are threatened and forced into prostitution, marriages, and even pregnancies.

Domestic violence

Especially in rural communities, Cambodian women are not only susceptible to domestic violence, but also have "little legal recourse".
 Due to limited education, many Cambodian women are unable to protect themselves from discrimination, gender inequality, violence, and abuse.  They live unaware of their legal rights and/or global human rights standards.

In 2004, Gender and Development for Cambodia reported that "23% of women have suffered physical domestic abuse".

Social status

Of late, there has been much discussion over the roles of Cambodian women in the society of today.  What Cambodian tradition tell us about their daily roles is being revisited.  In order to reach gender equity, gender norms need to reflect the present era in regard to leadership roles. Some would say that elevating a woman’s worth from the traditional representations of women in Khmer culture and stating that a woman isn’t second to a man, would help to make Cambodian women their own agents.

In recent years, young women in Cambodia have been influenced by Western ideas which are contrary to traditional Cambodian culture. One example, found particularly in the capital of Phnom Penh, is that young female Cambodians are overtly consuming liquors and other alcoholic beverages in restaurants. Other areas in which Western influence is detected include a sense of equal rights between men and women, peer pressure, companionship, experimentation, trouble within the family, abandonment by a boyfriend, and through advertising.

See also
Chbab Srey, Khmer code of conduct for women
Courtship, marriage, and divorce in Cambodia
Women's Media Centre of Cambodia

References

Further reading
McCarthy, Casey. Cambodia's First Lady becomes National Champion for Women's and Children's Health, February 21, 2011, un.org.kh
Cambodia's First Lady appointed national champion for women’s and children’s health, Feature Story, February 23, 2011, unaids.org
The Situation of Women in Cambodia, July 2004, 55 pages.
Staff. Accelerating the Global Health Initiative: Cambodia's HIV/AIDS Efforts Put Women in the Driver's Seat, Women in Development, February/March 2011, USAID from the American people, usaid.gov
Outreach Worker Manual, Cambodian Women's Health Project, January 1998, 60 pages, cancercontrol.cancer.gov

External links

Cambodian Women's Crisis Center (CWCC)
Women's Media Centre of Cambodia
Cambodia Women Health Organization